The serine/threonine-protein kinase/endoribonuclease inositol-requiring enzyme 1 α  (IRE1α) is an enzyme that in humans is encoded by the ERN1 gene.

Function 
The protein encoded by this gene is the ER to nucleus signalling 1 protein, a human homologue of the yeast Ire1 gene product. This protein possesses intrinsic kinase activity and an endoribonuclease activity and it is important in altering gene expression as a response to endoplasmic reticulum-based stress signals (mainly the unfolded protein response). Two alternatively spliced transcript variants encoding different isoforms have been found for this gene.

Signaling 

IRE1α possesses two functional enzymatic domains, an endonuclease and a trans-autophosphorylation kinase domain. Upon activation, IRE1α oligomerizes and carries out an unconventional RNA splicing activity, removing an intron from the X-box binding protein 1 (XBP1) mRNA, and allowing it to become translated into a functional transcription factor, XBP1s. XBP1s upregulates ER chaperones and endoplasmic reticulum associated degradation (ERAD) genes that facilitate recovery from ER stress.

Clinical significance 
As IRE1α is a primary sensor for unfolded protein response, its disruption could be linked with neurodegenerative diseases, by which the accumulation of intracellular toxic proteins serves as one of the key pathogenic mechanisms. IRE1 signalling is considered to be pathogenic in Alzheimer's disease, Parkinson's disease and amyotrophic lateral sclerosis.

Interactions 

ERN1 has been shown to interact with Heat shock protein 90kDa alpha (cytosolic), member A1.

Inhibitors 

Two types of inhibitors exist targeting either the catalytic core of the RNase domain or the ATP-binding pocket of the kinase domain.

RNase domain inhibitors 

Salicylaldehydes (3-methoxy-6-bromosalicylaldehyde, 4μ8C, MKC-3946, STF-083010, toyocamycin.

ATP-binding pocket 

Sunitinib and APY29 inhibit the ATP-binding pocket but allosterically activate the IRE1α RNase domain.

Compound 3 prevents kinase activity, oligomerization and RNase activity.

References

Further reading